Nizhnetavdinsky District  is an administrative district (raion), one of the twenty-two in Tyumen Oblast, Russia. As a municipal division, it is incorporated as Nizhnetavdinsky Municipal District. It is located in the west of the oblast. Its administrative center is the rural locality (a selo) of Nizhnyaya Tavda. Population: 23,048 (2010 Census);  The population of Nizhnyaya Tavda accounts for 29.7% of the district's total population.

References

Notes

Sources

Districts of Tyumen Oblast